Year 1178 (MCLXXVIII) was a common year starting on Sunday (link will display the full calendar) of the Julian calendar, the 1178th year of the Common Era (CE) and Anno Domini (AD) designations, the 178th year of the 2nd millennium, the 78th year of the 12th century, and the 9th year of the 1170s decade.

Events 
 By place 

 Europe 
 June 30 – Emperor Frederick I (Barbarossa) is crowned King of Burgundy at Arles. He will repeat the ceremony in 1186. Returning to Germany, he begins proceedings against Henry III (the Lion), duke of Saxony, who has been charged by Saxon noblemen with breaking the king's peace. 
 July 17 – Saracen pirates, from the Balearic Islands, raid the Cistercian monastery of Saint Honorat on the Lérins Islands, and the city of Toulon, killing an estimated 300 and taking captives. The surviving captives are freed from the Balearic Islands in 1185.
 King George III defeats a nobles' revolt and proclaims his 18-year-old daughter Tamar (the Great) as co-ruler of Georgia.
 Orio Mastropiero is elected by the Council of Forty as doge of Venice, following the retirement of Sebastiano Ziani.
 Portuguese forces under King Afonso I (the Conqueror) capture the city of Beja from the Almohads.

 By topic 

 Art and Science 
 The Leaning Tower of Pisa begins to lean, as the third level is completed (approximate date). 

 Religion 
 Summer – Antipope Callixtus III submits to Pope Alexander III after having reigned for 10 years with support from Frederick I.
 June 18 – Five monks from Canterbury see what is possibly the Giordano Bruno crater being formed.

Births 
 October 27 – Zhen Dexiu, Chinese politician (d. 1235)
 December 22 – Antoku, emperor of Japan (d. 1185)
 Alam al-Din al-Hanafi, Ayyubid mathematician (d. 1251)
 Al-Faqih al-Muqaddam, Arab religious leader (d. 1232)
 Armand de Périgord, French Grand Master (d. 1244)
 Hugh I, Sardinian ruler (Judge of Arborea) (d. 1211)
 Matteo Rosso Orsini, Italian politician (d. 1246)
 Peter II (the Catholic), king of Aragon (d. 1213)
 Roland of Cremona, French theologian (d. 1259)
 Thomas I (or Tommaso), count of Savoy (d. 1233)
 Wei Liaoweng, Chinese politician and philosopher (d. 1237)
 Wuzhun Shifan, Chinese calligrapher and painter (d. 1249)

Deaths 
 February 17 – Evermode of Ratzeburg, German bishop 
 May 27 – Godfrey van Rhenen, bishop of Utrecht
 December 30 – Pribislav, prince of Mecklenburg
 Áedh Ua Flaithbheartaigh, king of Iar Connacht
 Ada de Warenne, Scottish noblewoman (b. 1120)
 Amadeus I, Swiss nobleman (House of Geneva)
 Anthelm of Belley, French prior and bishop (b. 1107)
 Frowin of Engelberg (the Blessed), Swiss abbot
 Fujiwara no Narichika, Japanese nobleman (b. 1138)
 Kristin Sigurdsdatter, Norwegian princess (b. 1125)
 Nashwan al-Himyari, Arab theologian and writer
 Petrus Comestor, French theologian and writer
 Philippa of Antioch, princess of Antioch (b. 1148)
 Richard the Chaplain, bishop of Cell Rigmonaid
 Walter de Bidun, English bishop and chancellor
 William of Lucca, Italian theologian and writer

References